The 2022–23 North Texas Mean Green men's basketball team represents the University of North Texas during the 2022–23 NCAA Division I men's basketball season. The team is led by fifth-year head coach Grant McCasland, and plays their home games at UNT Coliseum in Denton, Texas as a member of Conference USA.

The season marks the team's last season as members of Conference USA before joining the American Athletic Conference on July 1, 2023.

Previous season 
The Mean Green finished the 2021–22 season 25–7, 16–2 in C-USA Play to finish as regular season champions. They defeated Rice in the quarterfinals of the C-USA tournament before losing in the semifinals to Louisiana Tech.  As a No. 1 seed who didn’t win their conference tournament, they received an automatic bid to the National Invitation Tournament where they defeated Texas State in the first round before losing in the second round to Virginia.

Offseason

Departures

Incoming transfers

2022 recruiting class

Roster

Schedule and results

|-
!colspan=12 style=| Non-conference regular season

|-
!colspan=12 style=| Conference USA regular season

|-
!colspan=12 style=| Conference USA tournament

|-
!colspan=12 style=| NIT

Source

See also
 2022–23 North Texas Mean Green women's basketball team

References

North Texas Mean Green men's basketball seasons
North Texas Mean Green
North Texas men's basketball
North Texas men's basketball
North Texas